The Hot Port of Hong Kong or Hong Kong Hot Harbor (German: Heißer Hafen Hongkong) is a 1962 Italian-West German crime film directed by Jürgen Roland and starring Marianne Koch, Klausjürgen Wussow and Dominique Boschero.

The film's sets were designed by the art director Hans Berthel. It was shot on location in Hong Kong.

Cast
 Marianne Koch as Joan Kent 
 Klausjürgen Wussow as Peter Holberg 
 Dominique Boschero as Colette May Wong 
 Brad Harris as Polizeiinspektor McLean 
 Horst Frank as Frank Marek 
 Carlo Tamberlani as Dr. Ellington 
 Dorothee Parker as Mary Hall 
 Mu Chu as Li
 Hao Chen
 Renato Montalbano
 Chia Tang
 Feng Tien
 Siu Tin Yuen

References

Bibliography 
 Bergfelder, Tim. International Adventures: German Popular Cinema and European Co-Productions in the 1960s. Berghahn Books, 2005.

External links 
 

1962 films
1962 crime films
German crime films
Italian crime films
West German films
1960s German-language films
Films directed by Jürgen Roland
Films set in Hong Kong
Films shot in Hong Kong
Gloria Film films
1960s German films
1960s Italian films